Bruno Buchberger (born 22 October 1942) is Professor of Computer Mathematics at Johannes Kepler University in Linz, Austria. In his 1965 Ph.D. thesis, he created the theory of Gröbner bases, and has developed this theory throughout his career. He named these objects after his advisor Wolfgang Gröbner. Since 1995, he has been active in the Theorema project at the University of Linz.

Career
In 1987 Buchberger founded and chaired the Research Institute for Symbolic Computation (RISC) at Johannes Kepler University. In 1985 he started the Journal of Symbolic Computation, which has now become the premier publication in the field of computer algebra.

Buchberger also conceived Softwarepark Hagenberg in 1989 and since then has been directing the expansion of this Austrian technology park for software.

In 2014 he became a member of the Global Digital Mathematical Library Working Group  of the IMU.

Awards
Wilhelm Exner Medal (1995).
Paris Kanellakis Theory and Practice Award (2007). For theory of Gröbner bases.
Golden Medal of Honor by the Upper Austrian Government
Honorary doctorates from the Universities of Nijmegen (1993), Timișoara (2000), Bath (2005), Waterloo (2011), and Innsbruck (2012).
Herbrand Award for Distinguished Contributions to Automated Reasoning (2018)

See also
Buchberger's algorithm
Gröbner bases

References

Sources

External links

Buchberger's university website
RISC website

1942 births
20th-century Austrian mathematicians
21st-century Austrian mathematicians
Living people
Scientists from Innsbruck
Academic staff of Johannes Kepler University Linz